Huevocartoon is a Mexican multimedia entertainment brand founded in November 2001 by Gabriel and Rodolfo Riva Palacio Alatriste, Carlos Zepeda Chehaibar, and Rodolfo Riva Palacio Velasco. It consists of an internet series, six feature films, a video game, a television special, and advertisements, featuring anthropomorphic eggs in a civilized and humorous setting.

History

The brand was founded in November 2001 by brothers Gabriel and Rodolfo Riva Palacio Alatriste, Carlos Zepeda Chehaibar, and Rodolfo Riva Palacio Velascoas, as an internet website dedicated to animation, originally called 'La Comunidad Huevo' (Spanish for 'The Egg Community'). The website was officially launched on 6 January 2002. Since then, the website gained 3 million visitors within the first three months of its launch, and at the end of 2004, it was visited 230,000 times daily. Tycoon Enterprises, a marketing investing company, invested in Huevocartoon within six months of the launch after gaining popularity. Hoping to expand into higher-budgeted projects, such as a film and a television series, the company partnered with several marketing companies, including Sabritas, Renault, and Telcel, to include the 'Huevos' characters and brands in their advertisements. Nonetheless, the marketing and licensing campaign helped the company's budget and plans for a film has moved on.

The company's first film, Una Película de Huevos (A Film of Eggs), was released in theaters in Mexico on 21 April 2006, becoming a major box-office hit, grossing $142.3 million pesos (est. US$7.6 million). The film later won the Ariel Award (Mexico's equivalent to the Academy Awards) in 2007 for 'Mejor largometraje de animación' ('Best Animated Feature Film').

The second film, Otra Película de Huevos y un Pollo (Another Film of Eggs and a Chicken), was released on 20 March 2009. Despite a weaker performance, it was another box-office success, grossing $113.5 million pesos.

Un gallo con muchos huevos was released in Mexico on 20 August 2015 where it was a major box-office success and holds the record as the highest-grossing Mexican animated film of all time. It grossed $167.8 million pesos (est. US$9 million). Despite being the third film in the franchise the film's 2 predecessors have no English subtitles or dubs and were never released outside Mexico. The film was also released in the United States on 4 September 2015, distributed by Pantelion Films, where it was a surprise box-office success. The release thrilled the filmmakers, to which co-director Gabriel Riva called it "a dream come true", as it had been their goal to release a film in the U.S. from the beginning of the company's foundation. Neither of its predecessors were released in the United States in any major format due to their controversial and edgy content, failing to match the humor code within the American animation film industry.

The company's fourth film, Marcianos vs. Mexicanos, was released on 9 March 2018. Unlike its past feature productions, Marcianos has an original concept and features an entirely human cast. Additionally, the film is aimed for an adult audience. The film features the voices of Adal Ramones, Martha Higareda, Omar Chaparro, Angélica Vale and Eduardo Manzano. However, unlike their previous films, it received negative reviews and was a box-office disappointment.

Un rescate de huevitos was released on 12 August 2021 in Mexico. The original voice cast reprised their roles as they're joined by newcomers including Jesús Ochoa, Mauricio Barrientos, Mara Escalante, Freddy Ortega, and Germán Ortega. It was later released in the United States on 27 August 2021 by Pantelion Films.

Huevitos congelados, the final film in the Huevos film series, was released on streaming as a Vix+ original. In addition to returning voice actors, new comers include Miguel Rodarte, Arath de la Torre, Mauricio Castillo, and Vadhir Derbez.

Other upcoming films include horror-comedy Grimalkin, Aron Warner-produced Alebrijes, and a Huevos spin-off film focused on Confi.

Huevocartoon Producciones

Huevocartoon Producciones is the production label of the company. It is best known for producing films based on the "Huevos" characters from the internet shorts. It spawned into a massively-successful film series, known as Huevos.

All of the films, with the exception of Marcianos vs. Mexicanos, have performed commercially well, three of which earning over $100 million pesos.

Films

Compilation

In development

Television

Frequent and recurring collaborates
In addition to the Riva brothers, Gabriel and Rodolfo, taking part in voicing aside of directing, producing, and writing, each film produced by Huevocartoon features the voice of famous Mexican talent, including Bruno Bichir, Carlos Espejel, and Angélica Vale, as well as some recognizable voice-over artists known for Spanish-dubbing in cartoons, such as Humberto Vélez and Rubén Moya. In the crew department, Spanish composer, Zacarías M. de la Riva composed music for Un gallo con muchos huevos, Un rescate de huevitos and Un gallo congelado. Amado López and Javier Calderón composed music for Marcianos vs. Mexicanos. Paco Arriagada co-produced the first two films. Ignacio Casares produced the other two films including Marcianos. The following consists of the list of actors and actresses who have provided voice work in two or more films. People who have single roles aren't included (see below).

Single-film collaborates
The following consists of a list of actors and actresses who have provided voice-overs to a character in at least one film. Only those who have notable roles are included.

Internet series

Huevocartoon (Spanish for Eggcartoon; also known as HuevocartoonTV) is a Mexican internet series created by Gabriel Riva Palacio Alatriste, Rodolfo Riva Palacio Alatriste, Carlos Zepeda Chehaibar, and Rodolfo Riva Palacio Velasco. Its content typically features characters portrayed as civilized eggs, set in a humorous setting which focuses on politics, socialization, and culture.

Much of the content is primarily aimed for a teen-to-adult audience as much of the shorts' content is "rauchy" and "edgy", to which co-creator Gabriel Riva Palacio Alatriste calls it a "latino South Park".

All the shorts are written, directed, and voiced by brothers, Gabriel and Rodolfo Riva Palacio Alatriste, and is produced by Huevocartoon Producciones. of the character design Walt Disney

The original YouTube channel was created in 2007, which has gained over 2 million subscribers. Later, the company launched a new YouTube channel in 2014, named HuevocartoonTV, designed specifically for an English-language audience.

New shorts will premiere in May 2023, titled "Season 2023", with new and returning characters.

Videos

Poeta Huevos (Shakespearean Eggs): A parody of William Shakespeare, the sketch follows three eggs dressed in a medieval-like attire, Ferdinand, Rododendro, and Gabrelle, as they attempt to recite a poetry to the audience in several cuts, while become increasingly drunk due to consuming alcohol.
Huevos Rancheros (The Ranchero Eggs): Inspired by the Mexican dish of the same name, the sketch focuses on two ranchero-like eggs, named Chema and Chava. The eggs are portrayed homosexual in nature.
Tenorio e Inés (Romegg and Juliegg): In a parody of Don Juan Tenorio by José Zorrilla, Tenorio the egg tries to recite a poet to Inés, an insensitive and rude egg who frequently interrupts Ternorio's poets.
Huevo Filósofo (Egg Philosopher): The Huevo Filósofo, who is sometimes referred as the "Easter Egg", is a psychedelic, clueless, and friendly hippie-like egg. He often enjoys smoking marijuana, and is very talkative, haughty, and ridiculous. He often calls everyone "carnal".
Huevo Zen (Zen Master Egg): The sketch is about an egg with a karate gear who tries to teach martial arts and meditation with his young lemon companion, Lee-Mong-Shu-Pao.
Huevos Bongó (Bongo Eggs): Two Cuban-origin eggs are a bongo duo who start a conversation and then transform the talk into a Caribbean song using their bongo drums.
El Huevasesino (The Egg Assassin): An egg within the horror figures, such as Saw, Friday the 13th, The Ring, It, etc., was considered a villain at first. In the end, however, he reveals his true friendly nature and wants to make friends, but is resulted in being killed, insulted, and ignored. He wears a hockey mask and carries a large knife, in parody of Jason Voorhees.
Los Super Huevos (The Super Eggs) - They are a group of superheroes who make up "the Egg of Justice ", parodying the Justice League.
El Huevo Santa (Santa Egg) - Being a parody of Santa Claus, the Huevo Santa is a bitter and serious egg that gives bad gifts of low cost to the children because, according to him, they never behave well. He's never been in the chimney when he delivers gifts. In his workshop, his helper elves don't work. He only has a hungry-looking reindeer: Rudolph.
Dr. Frankendemente y Eggor (Dr. Frankenegg and Eggor) - In a parody of Frankenstein. Dr. Frankendemente and his assistant Eggor will try to build the Monster Egg to scare people away, but there will always be something missing, and everything will go wrong because of Eggor.
Huevitos en el Espacio (Eggs in Space) - A space crew that has the mission to travel on their spacecraft to discover new hidden objects or fight with enemies in a comic way, in parody of Star Trek.

Reception
The web series has gained 3 million viewers on the first day of its launch.  To date, the videos have gained a total of 594.2 million views, according to the company's website.

See also
Ánima Estudios
Animex Producciones

References

External links
Official website
Huevocartoon History (in Spanish)
HuevocartoonOficial on YouTube (current page)
Huevocartoon on YouTube (original page)
HuevocartoonTV on YouTube (English page)

2002 establishments in Mexico
Mexican animation studios
Film production companies of Mexico
Mass media companies established in 2002
Comedy web series
Viral videos
2002 web series debuts
Entertainment companies established in 2002
Adult comedy web series
Adult animated web series
Adult animation studios
Animated film series
Animated web series